Andrew Gardner is an archaeologist working in the areas of Roman archaeology and archaeological theory.

Education 
Gardner studied for a BA and MA in Archaeology at UCL. He completed a PhD in 2001 at the UCL Institute of Archaeology.

Career 
Since 2005 Gardner has been a lecturer in archaeology at the Institute of Archaeology. His recent work has drawn on Border Studies to consider frontiers in Roman Britain. Gardner is on the editorial board for Britannia. and Papers from the Institute of Archaeology. He was elected as a Fellow of the Society of Antiquaries in 2011. Gardner has had a long-standing involvement with the Theoretical Roman Archaeology Conference and is a member of the Advisory Committee. In 2001, TRAC formed a standing committee to oversee the conference, consisting of Gardner, Martin Carruthers, Carol van Driel-Murray, Jason Lucas, Louise Revell, and Ellen Swift. The committee also edited the proceedings for the 2001 conference.

Selected publications 

Gardner, A  2002. Social identity and the duality of structure in late Roman-period Britain. Journal of Social Archaeology 2(3): 323-351.
Gardner, A. 2007. An Archaeology of Identity: soldiers and society in late Roman Britain. Left Coast Press.
Gardner, A. 2012. Time and empire in the Roman world. Journal of Social Archaeology 12(2), 145-166.
Gardner, A. 2013. Thinking about Roman imperialism: postcolonialism, globalisation and beyond? Britannia 44: 1-25.
Gardner, A. 2017. Brexit, boundaries and imperial identities: A comparative view. Journal of Social Archaeology 17(1), 3-26.

References 

Living people
Year of birth missing (living people)